Nomzamo  Mbatha (born 13 July 1990), is a South African actress, television personality, businesswoman, accountant and human rights activist.

Early life

She attended Rippon Primary School in Durban and Bechet High School, where she obtained her High School Diploma. In 2018, she graduated from the University of Cape Town with a Bachelor of Commerce degree specializing in accounting.

Career
Mbatha auditioned for a television show in July 2012. She has also started acting on Isibaya in 2013 and also became the main character, this marked her acting debut and was praised by crtics for playing Thandeka Zungu. The search, which was held at Cape Town, attracted over 600 contestants. She placed in the top 70 and later the top 10. She was one of the three top finalists. In 2015, she made a film debut in Tell Me Sweet Something with Maps Maponyane which was released in September 4, of that same year, and a television show Umlilo from 2015 to 2016. That same year, she began hosting a reality travel show called "Holiday Swap", on South African Broadcasting Corporation.

In 2015, she was selected to represent Neutrogena, being the first South African in that role.

In 2021, she appeared in the film Coming 2 America. She's set to star in the film Assassin.

The previous year, Mbatha signed with talent management agency Creative Artists Agency.

Filmography

Other achievements
In 2018, Mbatha was recognized as one of the OkayAfrika 100 Women 2018 Honorees, by OkayAfrica Digital Media.

In 2018, she spent time touring Kenyan refugee camps, in her role as UNHCR Ambassador.

She received an Africa Movie Academy Award for Best Actress nomination for playing "Moratiwa" in Tell Me Sweet Something (2015).

In January 2019, she was appointed a UNHCR Goodwill Ambassador. In October 2019, she was inducted into the Golden Key International Honour Society as one of its Honorary members.

Personal life
As of 2019, Mbatha resides in Los Angeles, California. She has a younger brother, 24, Zamani Mbatha, who's also an actor.

References

External links 

 
About Nomzamo Mbatha

1990 births
Living people
People from KwaMashu
Zulu people
South African film actresses
21st-century South African actresses
University of Cape Town alumni